The Victoria Racing Club Oaks (known as the Kennedy Oaks for sponsorship reasons), is a Victoria Racing Club (VRC) Group 1 Thoroughbred horse race for three-year-old fillies, run under set weights conditions, over 2,500 metres at Flemington Racecourse, Melbourne, Australia on the third day of the VRC Spring Carnival, the Thursday after the Melbourne Cup in early November.  Total prize money for the race is A$1,000,000

History

Record attendance for the race day was set in 2004 with 110,677 in attendance.

1952 Racebook

Name
1861–2006 - VRC Oaks
2007–2016 - Crown Oaks
2017 onwards - Kennedy Oaks

Distance
1861–1971 - 1 miles (~2400 metres)
1972 – 2400 metres
1973 onwards -  2500 metres

Grade
1855–1978 -  Principal Race
1979 onwards - Group 1

Social attraction
Popularly known as Ladies Day or just Oaks Day (but in recent times also colloquially called Blokes Day), Kennedy Oaks Day has been an extraordinary phenomenon of racing. Despite being held on a work day (Melbourne Cup Day is the only public holiday during the racing carnival), Oaks Day boasts the fastest growing crowd records of any day in the Carnival; excluding the pandemic-impacted years of 2020 and 2021, every Oaks Day since 1994 has drawn a crowd of 50,000 or more. While the main draw card of the race day are the stars of the track, the other popular event on Crown Oaks Day is the annual "Fashions on the Field" celebrations. Introduced by the Victoria Racing Club in 1962 in an effort to woo more women to the track, Ladies day and the Fashions on the Field concept has grown considerably with each year and is now adopted at racetracks and smaller events all over the world.

Attendance

2021 – 10,000 (restricted attendance due to the COVID-19 pandemic)
2020 – 0 (no attendance due to COVID-19 pandemic restrictions)
2019 – 57,296
2018 – 61,355
2017 – 63,673
2016 – 60,888
2015 – 57,560
2014 – 64,430
2013 – 66,757
2012 – 71,825
2011 – 71,659
2010 – 75,088
2009 – 80,112
2008 – 89,338
2007 – 95,230
2006 – 104,131
2005 – 100,263
2004 – 110,677
2003 – 101,179
2002 – 103,269
2001 – 101,201
2000 – 96,406
1999 – 83,870
1998 – 77,301
1997 – 75,482
1996 – 67,086
1995 – 62,388
1994 – 50,176
1993 – 46,744
1992 – 50,925
1991 – 54,023
1990 – 50,196
1989 – 51,673
1988 – 48,490
1987 – 45,329
1986 – 42,649
1985 – 39,051
1984 – 40,812
1983 – 38,633
1982 – 37,028
1981 – 37,353
1980 – 37,098

Winners

 2022 - She's Extreme
 2021 - Willowy
2020 - Personal
2019 - Miami Bound
2018 - Aristia
2017 - Pinot
2016 - Lasqueti Spirit
2015 - Jameka
2014 - Set Square
2013 - Kirramosa
2012 - Dear Demi
2011 - Mosheen
2010 - Brazilian Pulse
2009 - Faint Perfume
2008 - Samantha Miss
2007 - Arapaho Miss
2006 - Miss Finland
2005 - Serenade Rose
2004 - Hollow Bullet
2003 - Special Harmony
2002 - Bulla Borghese
2001 - Magical Miss
2000 - Lovelorn
1999 - Tributes
1998 - Grand Archway
1997 - Kensington Palace
1996 - My Brightia
1995 - Saleous
1994 - Northwood Plume
1993 - Arborea
1992 - Slight Chance
1991 - Richfield Lady
1990 - Weekend Delight
1989 - Tristanagh
1988 - Research
1987 - Sandy's Pleasure
1986 - Diamond Shower
1985 - My Tristram's Belle
1984 - Spirit Of Kingston
1983 - Taj Eclipse
1982  -  Rom's Stiletto
1981  -  Rose Of Kingston
1980  -  November Rain
1979  -  Brava Jeannie
1978  -  Scomeld
1977  -  Show Ego
1976  -  Surround
1975  -  Denise's Joy
1974  -  Leica Show
1973  -  Bonnybel
1972  -  Toltrice
1971  -  Kiss Me Cait
1970  -  Sanderae
1969  -  Goliette
1968  -  Double Steel
1967  -  Chosen Lady
1966  -  Farmer's Daughter
1965  -  Gipsy Queen
1964  -  Light Fingers
1963  -  Jingle Bells
1962  -  Arctic Star
1961  -  Indian Summer
1960  -  Lady Sybil
1959  -  Mintaway
1958  -  Chicola
1957  -  Amarco
1956  -  Innesfell
1955  -  Evening Peal
1954  -  Lady Mogambo
1953  -  Waltzing Lady
1952  -  Waterlady
1951  -  Lady Havers
1950  -  True Course
1949  -  Chicquita
1948  -  Grey Nurse
1947  -  Nizam's Ring
1946  -  Sweet Chime
1945  -  Cherie Marie
1944  -  Provoke
1943  -  Three Wheeler
1942  -  East End
1941  -  Primavera
1940  -  Session
1939  -  Triode
1938  -  French Gem
1937  -  Prairie Moon
1936  -  Siren
1935  -  Nalda
1934  -  Alinura
1933  -  Golden Hair
1932  -  Protea
1931  -  Gallantic
1930  -  Barbette
1929  -  Lineage
1928  -  Opera Queen
1927  -  Ninbela
1926  -  Lanson
1925  -  Redshank
1924  -  Miss Disraeli
1923  -  Frances Tressady
1922  -  Scarlet
1921  -  Furious
1920  -  Mufti
1919  -  Hyades
1918  -  Stagegirl
1917  -  Folly Queen
1916  -  Thana
1915  -  Rosanna
1914  -  Carlita
1913  -  Mint Sauce
1912  -  Moe
1911  -  Wilari
1910  -  Styria
1909  -  Lady San
1908  -  Nushka
1907  -  Lady Rylstone
1906  -  Yabba Gabba
1905  -  Lady Wallace
1904  -  Red Streak
1903  -  Sweet Nell
1902  -  Fishery
1901  -  Beanba
1900  -  Haulette
1899  -  Nitre
1898  -  Symmetry
1897  -  Eleusive
1896  -  Thunder Queen
1895  -  Auraria
1894  -  Regina
1893  -  The Dauphine
1892  -  Etra Weenie
1891  -  Tiraillerie
1890  -  Litigant
1889  -  Spice
1888  -  Pearlshell
1887  -  Dainty
1886  -  The Nun
1885  -  Uralla
1884  -  Venetia
1883  -  Quality
1882  -  Vaucluse
1881  -  Royal Maid
1880  -  Sapphire
1879  -  Petrea
1878  -  Melita
1877  -  Pardon
1876  -  Briseis
1875  -  Maid Of All Work
1874  -  Gaslight
1873  -  Rose D'amour
1872  -  Sunshine
1871  -  Formosa
1870  -  Florence
1869  -  Kestrel
1868  -  My Dream
1867  -  Sylvia
1866  -  Sea Gull
1865  -  Lady Heron
1864  -  Illumination
1863  -  Aruma
1862  -  Modesty
1861  -  Palestine

See also
Thoroughbred racing in Australia
Melbourne Spring Racing Carnival
 List of Australian Group races
 Group races

References

Group 1 stakes races in Australia
Flat horse races for three-year-old fillies
Flemington Racecourse